The 1973 NASCAR Winston Cup Series was the 25th season of professional stock car racing in the United States and the 2nd modern-era Cup season. The season began on Sunday January 21 and ended on Sunday October 21. 31 races were scheduled in the 1973 season. 28 were held.

Benny Parsons was crowned Winston Cup champion at the end of the season finishing 67 points ahead of Cale Yarborough. Lennie Pond was named NASCAR Rookie of the Year, succeeding Larry Smith, who was fatally injured in the year's Talladega 500. David Pearson dominated the season winning 11 of the 18 races he entered.  Ten of Pearson's wins were on superspeedways, setting a NASCAR record for superspeedway wins that lasted until Bill Elliott broke it in 1985.

Pre-season changes

Rule changes 
Rule changes made in late November 1972 adjusted maximum carburetor sleeve sizes depending upon the type of engine and manufacturer of a given car. As NASCAR President Bill France Jr. explained, the goal of the adjustments was to differentiate between engines manufactured specifically for racing, and "volume production" engines that came off a consumer assembly line. This was done "...so the events next year can continue to be representative of the type of the extremely close competition that has been typical of NASCAR racing."

In 1973, the NASCAR points system was changed. In 1972, only the number of laps completed in a race (regardless of position) counted toward the accumulation of points. In 1973, points were awarded both for the number of laps in a race completed, and for a finish in the top 50 in a race, a higher placing receiving more points. Additionally, the first-place finisher received a 25-point bonus.

Team changes 
Bobby Allison left Richard Howard's racing team, and would drive his own Chevrolet in 1973. Bobby Allison's team would also furnish a car for his brother, Donnie Allison and the new DiGard Racing team.  Taking Bobby's place on the Howard racing team would be Cale Yarborough, returning from the USAC Stock Car division.

Richard Petty, driver and owner of Petty Enterprises, expected to be racing exclusively in Dodge automobiles in 1973 (rather than the mix of Dodge and Plymouth the team had been).

Buddy Baker, who took over at Krauskopf Racing after Bobby Isaac left that team after the 1972 Southern 500, now signed up with Krauskopf for the full 1973 season, driving Dodges.

Retirements 
Fred Lorenzen, a NASCAR notable, ended his career with the end of the 1972 season.

Schedule
31 Winston Cup races were scheduled for the 1973 season. In the end it had 28 races, as well as two exhibition races. The schedule also includes two 125 Mile Qualifying Races, which are the qualifying races for the Daytona 500.

Key changes from 1973 include:

 Bristol and Atlanta swap their March/April race dates.
 The spring race at North Wilkesboro moved to the seventh race of the season.
 North Wilkesboro and Martinsville swap their September race dates.
 A second race at Fairgrounds Speedway returned to the Cup Series after a seven year absence, The race was held before the World 600 at Charlotte.
 The race at Texas World Speedway moved to round fourteen of the season.
 Riverside and Michigan swap their June race dates.
 Texas World Speedway's Texas 500 was removed after a single year.
 The Miller High Life 500 was set for March 4. Was not held because of financial difficulties (and an ownership change completed January 4, 1973) at Ontario Motor Speedway.
 The Northern 300 was Rained out on race day, then postponed until August 5 and finally cancelled at the request of the promoter on July 27 (insufficient time to promote the race).
 The Yankee 400 was cancelled on June 7 by track owner Roger Penske, citing the tight schedule of races the track had to accommodate in Summer 1973.

Race recaps 
Winston Western 500 - Indycar and road racing star Mark Donohue drove an AMC Matador with a set of disc brakes - new for racing at the time - and led 138 laps en route to the win.  David Pearson won the pole but never led and fell out with clutch failure, while Richard Petty started fifth and led 39 laps before his engine failed while leading on Lap 95.  Bobby Allison finished second driving a self-fielded Chevrolet following a surprise divorce from the Richard Howard team.  Cale Yarborough, new driver for Howard's team with the cars renumbered to #11, fell out with transmission failure.

Daytona 500 - Buddy Baker won the 500 pole in the Harry Hyde Dodge formerly driven by Bobby Isaac.  Baker led 156 laps but was closely pursued by Cale Yarborough until his engine failure with 45 laps to go.  Richard Petty, sporting a mustache called his Fu Manchu look, took up pursuit and grabbed the lead on a fast late pitstop; Baker blew his engine with six laps to go and finished a distant sixth as Petty grabbed his fourth 500 win.

Richmond 500 - Petty and Yarborough combined to lead 378 laps at the Richmond Fairgrounds.  Bobby Allison won the pole and led 66 laps but finished 49 laps down.  Petty lost time when he ran into a backmarker's car under yellow and needed bumper repairs; he nonetheless rallied past Baker for the win.

Miller High Life 500 - Ownership changes at Ontario Motor Speedway led to cancellation of NASCAR's annual race in 1973.

Carolina 500 - After two dismal races (he was not entered at Richmond) David Pearson began his record-setting assault on the 1973 season, leading 491 laps to easily win the Carolina 500.

Southeastern 500 - Cale Yarborough won the pole and then led all 500 laps for a two-lap win.  Numerous crashes, notably a bad wreck to Buddy Baker's Dodge, thinned the field.

Atlanta 500 - David Pearson and Cale Yarborough combined to lead 309 laps in a close battle before Pearson broke away for a two-lap win over Bobby Isaac.  Cale finished seven laps down.

Gwyn Staley 400 - Bobby Allison and Richard Petty returned to the scene of their famed slugfest from the previous October, but this time Petty put the race away early, leading 387 laps and finishing at least four laps ahead of the field.

Rebel 500 - Darlington Raceway's spring 400-miler was lengthened to 500 miles and David Pearson led the last 176 laps and grabbed his fourth career win in the event.  Crashes permeated the race to where only twelve of forty entries finished.  Second-place Benny Parsons was thirteen laps down, third-place Bobby Allison spent the last eighteen laps on pit road with engine failure, and seventh-place Richard Petty crashed out in a big melee in Turn One with 27 laps to go.

Virginia 500 - The Wood Brothers once again were entered in the only short track on their schedule.  David Pearson made up a lap with just over 100 laps to go when a yellow flew for an infield spectator needing transport to a local hospital; with no tunnel the track needed the yellow for an ambulance to leave.  Cale Yarborough had led 311 laps but Pearson would lead almost the entire final 106 laps after the yellow; the yellow angered team manager Junior Johnson.

Winston 500 - The starting field of 50 was expanded to 60 by track management, and it proved controversial in the subsequent 500, as early in the race Ramo Stott blew his engine on the backstretch and two separate packs of cars hit the oil and crashed; Wendell Scott's car was blasted by several other cars and Scott suffered serious injuries; Buddy Baker and Cale Yarborough were eliminated;, and when they got out of their cars they had to dodge additional crashing cars.   Bobby Allison ripped the track for the enormity of the field - "They (filled the field) all right, all over the backstretch."  David Pearson lost the lead draft (Baker saying Pearson fouled out the spark plugs on his Mercury and got them replaced under the lengthy yellow), and with all legitimate challengers eliminated he led 111 laps to an easy win, his fifth of the season and fifth in his consecutive starts.

Music City USA 420 - The Nashville Fairgrounds track had come under fire for banking up its corners to 35 degrees, and following driver complaints plus collapsing asphalt in Turn One from the previous season management lowered the banking to roughly 20 degrees.  Cale Yarborough led all but four laps to an easy win, only his second of the season.

World 600 - Buddy Baker and Richard Petty combined to lead 354 laps.  Petty slid into the wall in Three and finished a distant 13th.  Baker led the final sixteen laps and beat Pearson for the win, his first of the season and first since the end of the 1972 season.

Mason-Dixon 500 - Bobby Allison and Cale Yarborough led 175 laps between them but could do nothing about Pearson as he led all but three of the last 241 laps to yet another win.

Alamo 500 - The financially troubled Texas World Speedway hosted another Petty-Baker showdown as Buddy led 168 laps; the lead changed back and forth between the two before Baker lost power in the final 30 laps and finished a distant sixth behind Petty, who posted only his third superspeedway win in the last two seasons.  Rookie Darrell Waltrip finished second.  The track was unable to host its annual November 500-miler later that season.

Tuborg 400 - Bobby Allison ended his season-long winless streak when Richard Petty hit a barrier at the Riverside road course and Cale Yarborough blew his engine.  Allison led 85 laps to Petty's 57 and Cale's eleven for his first win since the 1972 American 500.  Finishing third was Benny Parsons, and largely unnoticed was that Parsons was clawing into contention for the season championship.

Motor State 400 - Once again Buddy Baker grabbed the lead at will, leading 119 laps, and once again it would not be enough as David Pearson led the last 23 laps for the fifth win for the Wood Brothers team (and Pearson's fourth, third with the #21) at Michigan International Speedway; but it was the combination's first Michigan win since Roger Penske took control of the speedway after the final collapse of Larry LoPatin's raceway empire.  Finishing fifth was Ron Keselowski, whose nephew Brad would race for Penske in coming years.

Medal of Honor Firecracker 400 - NASCAR mandated restrictor plates for all tracks beginning at Daytona after nearly two seasons running carburetor sleeves.  Bobby Allison and Cale Yarborough swept the front row in their Chevrolets and battled for the lead in the first 65 laps before Cale crashed out, but from there David Pearson and February's 500 champ Petty took over; Allison fell out with engine failure and Pearson beat Petty for his second straight Firecracker win and eighth win of the season, his highest win total since 1969.

Volunteer 500 - Lost amid the season's other drama was that Benny Parsons was in the thick of the points race despite not winning a race.  That part of his ledger was checked off at Bristol amid brutal heat and humidity; John A. Utsman had to drive relief for Parsons as the combination led 320 laps.  Early contenders Bobby Allison and Cale Yarborough crashed out while battling for the lead at Lap 331, leaving the #72 of Parsons and Utsman alone; runner-up L.D. Ottinger finished seven laps down.

Northern 300 - Bobby Allison qualified on pole. The Sunday race at Trenton Speedway was rained out, first postponed to August 5, and later cancelled entirely, as the race promoter did not believe they had time to properly promote the race.

Dixie 500 - David Pearson's superspeedway roll continued as he broke out of a tight duel with Cale Yarborough and led the final 165 laps for the win at Atlanta.  Richard Petty won the pole but blew his engine and hit the guardrail after 72 laps, while Bobby Isaac led 29 laps but crashed himself after 52 laps.  Also falling out was Buddy Baker with a broken axle, his sixth failure to finish a race so far in 1973.

Talladega 500 - Tragedy blackened the fifth running of Talladega's summer 500-miler.  Early in the race sophomore Larry Smith hit the wall in Turn One and did not survive what appeared to be a harmless crash.  The race, held amid heavy Alabama heat, was a ferocious affair; the lead changed 64 times, a motorsports record for the time, among fourteen drivers.  Bobby Allison won the pole while Donnie Allison for almost the first time all year had a strong run in the DiGard Racing Chevrolet.  Both crashed on Lap 156 when Donnie blew his engine and the wreck swept up Bobby.  Buddy Baker roared from 21st to the lead but even more dramatic was that Dick Brooks, driving the Crawford brothers Plymouth in a last-minute deal and starting 24th, roared through the field; he stormed to the lead when Baker broke a steering line and Pearson slowed, stealing the win in the biggest NASCAR upset in years.  A bigger story developed as well; Bobby Isaac parked Bud Moore's Ford and said he was quitting racing (Coo Coo Marlin got into the #15 and finished the race).

Nashville 420 - Buddy Baker ended months of frustration at Nashville's Fairgrounds speedway.  He took the lead from pole-sitter Cale Yarborough with 160 laps to go and beating Richard Petty by four laps.  Cale faltered and finished 23 laps down in 14th.  Bobby Allison blew another engine and finished 22nd.

Southern 500 - What was expected to be another David Pearson big track triumph after he won the pole instead became a runaway by Cale Yarborough as Cale led 277 laps for a runaway win.  Finishing fifth was Benny Parsons, quietly surging to the points lead, while finishing eighth was rookie Darrell Waltrip, now driving the Bud Moore Ford.

Capital City 500 - Richard Petty lead 429 laps to his first win since June, beating Cale Yarborough by two laps and pole-sitter Bobby Allison by three.  Benny Parsons finished fourth, his eleventh top-five finish of the season to go with the mid-summer Bristol win; the consistency kept boosting him in the points race.

Delaware 500 - Parsons grabbed another top five (finishing fourth after leading seven laps; they were his first laps led since winning at Bristol in July) while David Pearson grabbed another win, his tenth of the season.  Bobby Allison and Buddy Baker led 134 laps between them and finished behind Pearson in the top three, the only other cars on the lead lap.

Wilkes 400 - A year after their vicious showdown in the same race, Bobby Allison got a measure of revenge on Richard Petty and he swept to the win on the final lap, only his second of the season.  The two led 383 laps between them.  Cale Yarborough led eight laps and finished third at team manager Junior Johnson's home track.

Old Dominion 500 - A late yellow allowed Richard Petty to close up on Cale Yarborough and grab the win in the final 48 laps.  Cale had led 366 laps to Petty's 108.  Bobby Allison and Buddy Baker endured another frustrating day as they finished over 24 laps down but still together in the top four.

National 500 - Mounting frustration in several quarters spilled into an ugly weekend at Charlotte Motor Speedway.  Charlie Glotzbach appeared to win the pole in Hoss Ellington's Chevrolet but NASCAR ruled he ran with an illegal sliding restrictor plate and Glotzbach had to start 34th; he later crashed with David Pearson 46 laps into the race and the two drivers nearly came to blows exiting their cars.  Harry Hyde clashed with inspectors the entire week and finally parked Buddy Baker's Dodge 228 laps in and was officially disqualified.  Cale Yarborough led 257 laps and Richard Petty led 52 as the track paid $100 per lap led; with Cale the winner third-place Bobby Allison filed a protest demanding a re-inspection of the top two finishers.  The inspection process on Cale's Chevrolet - owned by track president Richard Howard and wrenched by Junior Johnson - lasted an unusually long number of hours and NASCAR finally issued a statement that the results of the inspection of Cale's car would be sent to NASCAR headquarters for additional study.  A furious Allison promptly filed a lawsuit against NASCAR but the suit was withdrawn after a closed-door meeting between Allison and Bill France Jr. of NASCAR, and the inspection process was changed at the next race.  Robert Yates, the head engine builder for Junior at the time, stated some thirty years later to racing writer Tom Jensen (in his book CHEATING: An Inside Look At The Bad Things Good NASCAR Winston Cup Racers Do In Pursuit of Speed) that the engine was indeed illegal.  Petty stated at the time that only three of his engine's eight cylinders were checked, and that they were of varying sizes that averaged out to the NASCAR-mandated limit of 431 CID.

American 500 - Amid the controversy Benny Parsons led the points race despite only one win.  Prerace inspections all weekend were noticeably tougher than usual; Cale Yarborough had to requalify on the second day of qualifying and ran faster than on pole day; he started 18th.  None of it could stop David Pearson from leading 396 laps to Cale's 85.  Parsons crashed hard into the lapped car of Johnny Barnes and the crash ripped out the right side of his Chevrolet; he felt his title hopes were over but his crew and other crews worked to rebuild the car to run enough laps to win the title; Parsons 28th, some 182 laps down, and won the title after Richard Petty broke a cam and finished 35th, Petty's eighth engine-related failure of the 1973 season.

Season recap

1973 Winston Cup Championship

(key) Bold – Pole position awarded by time. Italics – Pole position set by owner's points. * – Most laps led. ** - All laps led.

Manufacturers' Championship
Manufacturers would receive points for the highest placing driver with each manufacturer, from 9 points for a win, down to 1 point for a 6th-place finish. Points would be reduced if the highest placing driver placed lower than the corresponding manufacturer placing, or could be reduced by a penalty sanction.

References

 
Winston Cup Series
NASCAR Cup Series seasons